Sanjay Rajoura (born 18 September 1972)  is a stand-up comedian. He is a part of trio of "Aisi Taisi Democracy.

Biography

Personal life
Sanjay Rajoura was born in Ghaziabad, Uttar Pradesh (India) and has lived in Jaipur, Pune, Mumbai, Delhi, San Francisco and Singapore. He obtained his bachelor's degree in Sciences from Shyam Lal College, University of Delhi and then pursued his  master's degree in Computer Applications from BIT, Mesra.

Career
Sanjay worked in the software industry for more than 10 years before entering stand-up comedy. He often uses relevant and important topics and themes for his comedy.

Sanjay Rajoura had his first real attempt at stand up comedy in 2009 when he took the stage in an open mic event at a popular joint in Delhi post after being insisted by his friend Abish Mathew. His first two big solo events ‘Jat In Mood’  was held at India Habitat Centre, New Delhi, and both the shows were hugely successful.

He has been performing all over India with shows in Noida, Gurgaon, Pune, Bangalore and Delhi.

His work has been critically acclaimed to be unconventional, unique and fresh. His USP of narrating real-life stories in a funny satirical manner has been greatly appreciated and well received by the audience. Also, most of his stories have an underlying social message and hence is not totally meaningless comedy.

He played the lead role in The Fiction directed by Spandan Banerjee  which was showcased at Osians Film Festival, New Delhi and MIAAC New York, Washington.

His latest solo show called 'End The Occupation'  was an act that looks up and down on the "many India's" co-existing in urban spaces. It was about the quirks and idiosyncrasies of ordinary people, a look at the aspects of our social lives and also a peep into the shady side. Sanjay has performed this show at India Habitat Centre (Delhi) and Epicentre (Gurgaon). This show has gathered a lot of critical acclaim and has been extremely well received by the audience.
He also holds a politico-comedy show namely "Bharat Ek Mauj".

References

Indian stand-up comedians
Living people
1973 births